Audrey Bergot (born 1 February 1985) is a former French tennis player.

Her highest WTA singles ranking is 224, which she reached on 21 March 2011. Her career-high in doubles is 289, achieved on 2 May 2011.
Bergot won one singles title and two doubles titles on the ITF Women's Circuit in her career.

ITF Circuit finals

Singles: 10 (1 title, 9 runner-ups)

Doubles: 3 (2 titles, 1 runner-up)

External links
 
 
 

1985 births
Living people
Sportspeople from Lille
French female tennis players